Reginald Conole (23 April 1902 – 4 January 1967) was an Australian rules footballer who played with Port Adelaide in the South Australian National Football League (SANFL) and Melbourne in the Victorian Football League (VFL).

Conole, who was from Gladstone, had a late start to his league career, already 24 when he first started playing for Port Adelaide in 1926. He played his football across half-back or in the ruck and was also a cricketer with the Port Adelaide Cricket Club.

In 1928 he played in Port Adelaide's premiership winning team and missed a chance of going back-to-back the following year when an injury cost him a place in the decider.

Although he joined Melbourne in 1930, the injury kept him out of the side until round nine, but he only missed two more games for the rest of the year. He remained with Melbourne for three more seasons.

He represented South Australia at interstate football on one occasion.

References

1902 births
Australian rules footballers from South Australia
Melbourne Football Club players
Port Adelaide Football Club (SANFL) players
Port Adelaide Football Club players (all competitions)
1967 deaths
People from Gladstone, South Australia